I Now Pronounce You Chuck & Larry (also simply known as Chuck & Larry) is a 2007 American buddy comedy film directed by Dennis Dugan. It stars Adam Sandler and Kevin James as the title characters Chuck and Larry, respectively, two New York City firefighters who pretend to be a gay couple in order to ensure one of their children can receive healthcare; however, things go from bad to worse when an agent decides to verify their story. The film was released in the United States on July 20, 2007, and was Sandler's first role in a Universal Pictures film since Bulletproof in 1996. It grossed $187.1 million against an $85 million budget, but received generally negative reviews from critics. The movie's basic theme was later adapted in India as Dostana.

Plot
Chuck Levine, a womanizing bachelor, and Larry Valentine, a widower struggling to raise his two children, are two veteran New York City firefighters. During a sweep of a burned building, a segment of floor collapses on Chuck, but Larry saves his life. Chuck vows to repay Larry in any way possible. Experiencing an epiphany from the incident, Larry tries to increase his life insurance policy. He finds out that a lapse in the paperwork after his wife's death keeps him from naming his children as primary beneficiaries. The representative from the insurance company suggests that Larry find a new spouse so he can name that person as his beneficiary. However, there is no woman in Larry's life that he loves or trusts.

Inspired by a newspaper article about domestic partnerships, Larry asks Chuck to enter a civil union with him. Although Chuck declines at first, he is reminded of his debt to Larry and finally agrees, entering a domestic partnership and becoming Larry's primary beneficiary in the event of his death. To their dismay, however, investigators arrive to inquire about their abrupt partnership, suspecting fraud (it is also pointed out this was not the first time such a plan was attempted against the insurance company). Chuck and Larry decide to enlist the help of lawyer Alex McDonough, who suggests they have a formal wedding ceremony to prove they are committed. The pair travel to Niagara Falls, Ontario, Canada for a quick same-sex marriage at a wedding chapel, and Chuck moves in with Larry and his children.

Alex invites the couple to a gay benefit costume party. At the end of the evening, the partygoers are confronted by homophobic protesters. Chuck is provoked into punching their leader, and the incident is picked up by the local news. With their apparent homosexuality and marriage revealed, Chuck and Larry are heckled, and their fellow FDNY firefighters refuse to work with them. Their only ally is Fred G. Duncan, an angry, intimidating firefighter who reveals to Chuck that he is gay, and has not felt comfortable telling anyone.

Chuck becomes romantically interested in Alex after the two spend time together, but finds himself unable to get close to her because she thinks he is gay. During a heart-to-heart talk about relationships, the two spontaneously kiss, but Alex, still believing Chuck is gay and married, is shocked and immediately distances herself from Chuck. Meanwhile, city agent Clinton Fitzer arrives to investigate the couple, and the strain on both Larry and Chuck causes them to fight. Larry asserts that Chuck's constant absence to spend time with Alex is jeopardizing their ability to maintain the ruse of their relationship. Chuck tells Larry that he should stop refusing to move on from the death of his wife. Later that evening, a petition circulates to have Chuck and Larry thrown out of the firehouse. Upon discovering it, Larry confronts the crew about personal embarrassments on the job that Chuck and Larry helped them overcome. Afterwards, Chuck and Larry apologize to each other and reconcile their differences.

Eventually, numerous women publicly testify to having slept with Chuck in the recent past, and the couple is called into court to defend their marriage against charges of fraud. They are defended by Alex, and their fellow firefighters arrive in support, having realized all that Chuck and Larry have done for them over the years. Fitzer interrogates both men, and eventually demands the pair to kiss to prove that their relationship is physical. Before they do so, Chuck and Larry are interrupted by FDNY Captain Phineas J. Tucker, who reveals their marriage to be a sham and that they are both straight. He emphasizes that the situation reminded people not to be judgmental, and then offers to be arrested as well, since he knew about the false relationship but failed to report it. This prompts each of the other firefighters to claim a role in the wedding in a show of solidarity. Chuck, Larry, and the other firefighters are sent to jail, but they are quickly released after negotiating a deal to provide photos for an AIDS research benefit calendar, and Chuck and Larry keep their benefits.

Two months later, Fred and Alex's brother, Kevin, are married in Niagara Falls at the same chapel as Chuck and Larry. At the wedding party (which features musical guest Lance Bass), Larry moves on from the death of his wife and talks to a new woman, while Alex agrees to a dance with Chuck.

Cast
 Adam Sandler as Charles Todd "Chuck" Levine
 Kevin James as Lawrence Arthur "Larry" Valentine
 Jessica Biel as Alex McDonough
 Ving Rhames as Fred G. Duncan
 Nick Swardson as Kevin McDonough, Alex's brother and Fred's husband
 Steve Buscemi as Clinton Fitzer
 Dan Aykroyd as Captain Phineas J. Tucker
 Nicholas Turturro as Renaldo Pinera
 Richard Chamberlain as Councilman Banks
 Mary Pat Gleason as Teresa
 Rachel Dratch as Sara Powers
 Matt Winston as Glen Aldrich
 Peter Dante as Tony Paroni
 Cole Morgen as Eric Valentine, Larry's son
 Shelby Adamowsky as Tori Valentine, Larry's daughter
 Allen Covert as Steve
 John Farley as Criminal (voice)
 Lance Bass as Bandleader
 Dave Matthews as Salesman
 Blake Clark as Crazy homeless man
 Dan Patrick as New York cop
 Chandra West as "Doctor Honey"
 Tila Tequila and Jamie Chung as Hooters girls
 Dennis Dugan as Cab driver
 Rob Corddry as Jim the minister
 Jonathan Loughran as David Nootzie
 Becky and Jessie O'Donohue as Donna and Darla
 Robert Smigel as Mailman
 David Spade (uncredited) as Transvestite groupie
 Rob Schneider (uncredited) as Morris Takechi
 Arne Starr (uncredited) as Court supporter
 Jim Ford (uncredited) as Criminal stuck in chimney
 Michael Marcanio (uncredited) as Child Friend

Production
Producer Tom Shadyac had planned this film as early as 1999. I Now Pronounce You Joe and Benny, as the film was then titled, was announced as starring Nicolas Cage and Will Smith with Shadyac directing. In the official trailer, the song "Grace Kelly" by British pop star Mika was included.

Release

Critical response
Rotten Tomatoes, a review aggregator, reports a 14% approval rating based on 166 reviews, with an average rating of 3.80/10. The site's critical consensus reads, "Whether by way of inept comedy or tasteless stereotypes, I Now Pronounce You Chuck & Larry falters on both levels." On Metacritic, the film has a score of 37 out of 100 based on 33 critics, indicating "generally unfavorable reviews". Audiences polled by CinemaScore gave the film an average grade of "B+" on an A+ to F scale.

USA Today called it "a movie that gives marriage, homosexuality, friendship, firefighters, children and nearly everything else a bad name." The Wall Street Journal called it "an insult to gays, straights, men, women, children, African-Americans, Asians, pastors, mailmen, insurance adjusters, firemen, doctors -- and fans of show music."

The New York Post called it not an insult to homosexuality but to comedy itself. The Miami Herald was slightly less critical, calling the film "funny in the juvenile, crass way we expect."

Nathan Lee from the Village Voice wrote a positive review, praising the film for being "tremendously savvy in its stupid way" and "as eloquent as Brokeback Mountain, and even more radical." Controversial critic Armond White championed the film as "a modern classic" for its "ultimate moral lesson—that sexuality has absolutely nothing to do with who Chuck and Larry are as people".

Box office
Chuck & Larry grossed $34,233,750 and ranked #1 at the domestic box office in its opening weekend, higher than the other opening wide release that weekend, Hairspray, and the previous weekend's #1 film, Harry Potter and the Order of the Phoenix. By the end of its run, the film had grossed $120,059,556 domestically and $66,012,658 internationally for a worldwide total of $186,072,214.

Social responses and controversy
The film was screened prior to release for the Gay & Lesbian Alliance Against Defamation (GLAAD). GLAAD representative Damon Romine told Entertainment Weekly magazine: "The movie has some of the expected stereotypes, but in its own disarming way, it's a call for equality and respect".

According to Alexander Payne, the writer of an initial draft of the film, Sandler took many liberties with his screenplay, "Sandler-izing" the film, in his own words. At some point, he did not want his name attached to the project.

A review from AfterElton criticized the character played by Rob Schneider for using yellowface.

In November 2007, the producers of the Australian film Strange Bedfellows initiated legal action against Universal Studios for copyright violation. Strange Bedfellows was released three years before. In comparison, the films have 100 similar plot points. Both movie plots deal with two firemen, who pretend to be a gay couple for financial reasons, are investigated, and then have to deal with the situation with their friends and community. The suit was withdrawn in April 2008 after the producers of Strange Bedfellows received an early draft of Chuck & Larry that predated their film, and they were satisfied that they had not been plagiarized.

In January 2020, a member of Chicago's city council cited the film during an argument over a city plan to set aside contracts for gay- and transgender-owned businesses. Alderman Walter Burnett said, "I think about that movie about the two firemen where they were faking like they were gay… to get benefits. That's a concern of mine. How do you distinguish that?"

Home media
The film was released on DVD and Blu-ray on November 6, 2007.

Accolades

The film received eight Golden Raspberry Award nominations including Worst Picture, Worst Actor (Adam Sandler), Worst Supporting Actor (both Kevin James and Rob Schneider), Worst Supporting Actress (Jessica Biel), Worst Director (Dennis Dugan), Worst Screenplay and Worst Screen Couple (Adam Sandler with either Kevin James or Jessica Biel), but did not win any.

See also
 Boston marriage
 Mariage blanc
 Marriage of convenience
 Non-sexual same-sex marriage
 Sham marriage

References

External links

 
 
 
 
 

2000s buddy comedy films
2000s sex comedy films
2007 films
2007 LGBT-related films
2000s American films
American buddy comedy films
American LGBT-related films
American sex comedy films
2000s English-language films
2007 comedy films
Casting controversies in film
Film controversies
Film controversies in the United States
Films involved in plagiarism controversies
Films about weddings
Films set in 2006
Films set in New York City
Films shot in New York City
Films set in Ontario
Films about firefighting
Films directed by Dennis Dugan
Films produced by Adam Sandler
Films produced by Jack Giarraputo
Films scored by Rupert Gregson-Williams
Films with screenplays by Alexander Payne
Films with screenplays by Jim Taylor (writer)
Happy Madison Productions films
LGBT-related sex comedy films
Niagara Falls in fiction
Niagara Falls, Ontario
Same-sex marriage in film
Relativity Media films
Universal Pictures films
Homophobia in fiction
Films about anti-LGBT sentiment
LGBT-related controversies in film
LGBT-related controversies in the United States
Obscenity controversies in film
Race-related controversies in film